Ahmed Sharif as-Senussi (1873 – 10 March 1933) was the supreme leader of the Senussi order (1902–1933), although his leadership in the years 1917–1933 could be considered nominal. His daughter, Fatimah el-Sharif was the Queen consort of King Idris I of Libya.

Early life
Ahmed Sharif was the grandson of Muhammad ibn Ali as-Senussi, who founded the Senussi religious order in Cyrenaica in the middle of nineteenth century. In 1895, as-Senussi accompanied his father, Mohammed ash Sharif, and his uncle Mohammed el Mahdi, then leader of the Senussi order, on their trip from Jaghbub to Kufra, where they remained until 1899, and where Ahmed's father died in 1896.

In 1899 Mohammed el Mahdi and as-Senussi moved from Kufra to Zawiat Guru, in Chad, then to Bergo, aiming to check the French advance in Chad.

Struggle against the French
In 1900, the French forces approached to Kanem, Mohammed el Mahdi assigned his nephew Ahmed to lead the struggle. Between those who fought with Mohammed el Barrani (Ruler of Zawiyat Ber Alali in Kanem), and Omar Al-Mukhtar, the future resistance leader in Libya.

On 1 June 1902, Mohammed el Mahdi died. Because his son Mohammed Idris was only 12 years old, he named, before his death, his nephew Ahmed Sharif to be his successor.
Ahmed ash Sharif continued the struggle against the French in Chad which resulted at last into a failure as the French forces took Wadai on 1909.

Struggle against the Italians
In October 1911 the Italians invaded Libya, so as-Senussi suspended the struggle against the French in Chad and concentrated his efforts against the Italians. The Senussi movement had no big difficulty in unifying the capabilities of the tribes of Cyrenaica against the Italians.

The first major battle was attended by as-Senussi was Sidi Kraiyem near Derna. The battle itself was a setback to the Italian forces.
In 1915, after four years of hostilities, the Italian forces in Cyrenaica were almost confined to some separated points on the coast.

In his book "The Road to Mecca", Muhammad Asad tells his personal acquittance with as-Senussi and his personal travel to Libya with as-Sanussi's request.

War with the British in Egypt

With the outbreak of World War I, the Ottoman Empire, former rulers of Libya, was allied with the Central Powers and came into conflict with the British Empire. Italy joined the Allies in May 1915.

In February 1915 the Turks attacked the Suez Canal. At first, Ahmed ash Sharif, already a deputy in North Africa for the Ottoman caliph, was not involved in the conflict against the British. But in November 1915, encouraged by the Turks, the Senussi horsemen under him invaded Egypt and took Sallum. British forces withdrew to Mersa Matruh.

Since the Senussi had a great influence over the peoples of many Egyptian oases – Siwa, Kharga, and Dakhla, for example –  the British had to take the Senussi threat seriously.

In February 1916 the British counterattacked and recaptured Unjela, between Mersa Matruh and Sidi Barrani, and on 14 March they re-took Sallum.
Weakened by this defeat, as-Senussi conceded the leadership of the Senussi order to his 26-year-old cousin Mohammed Idris (later King Idris I of Libya), who conducted the negotiations with the British.

Death
In August 1918 he left Libya for Austria-Hungary, then to the Ottoman Empire.

Before abolishing the Ottoman Caliphate, Atatürk reportedly offered the caliphate to Ahmed Sharif as-Senussi, on the condition that he reside outside Turkey; Senussi declined the offer and confirmed his support for Abdülmecid II.

He later moved to Hejaz, where he died at Medina on 10 March 1933.

Notes

References

Kalifa Tillisi, "Mu’jam Ma’arik Al Jihad fi Libia 1911–1931", Dar Ath Thaqafa, Beirut, 1973.
Mohammed Fouad Shukri, "As Senussiya Deen wa Daula", Markaz ad Dirasat al Libiya, Oxford, 2005.
War Monthly Magazine, "The Sanussi 1915–17", unknown issue.
Mustafa Ali Houwaidi, "Al Haraka al Wataniya fi Shark Libia Khilal al Harb al Alamiya al Oula", Markaz Jihad al Libiyeen Did al Ghazu al Itali, Tripoli, 1988.
Muhammad Asad, "The Road to Mecca", The Book Foundation, Canada, 2005.

1873 births
1933 deaths
Ahmed Sharif
Libyan emigrants to Saudi Arabia
Libyan people of Algerian descent
Banu Idris
19th-century Arabs
20th-century Libyan people